Saerens is a surname. Notable people with the surname include:

 Émile Saerens (1937–2020), Belgian boxer
 Maibritt Saerens (born 1970), Danish actress